The cinereous bunting (Emberiza cineracea) is a bird in the bunting family Emberizidae, a passerine family now separated by most modern authors from the finches, Fringillidae. This species was first described by Christian Ludwig Brehm.

Range 
It breeds in southern Turkey and southern Iran, and winters around the Red Sea in north-eastern Africa and Yemen. A few isolated populations just about maintain a foothold within European borders, on islands in the Aegean Sea.

Habitat 
The cinereous bunting breeds on dry stony mountain slopes.

Description 
The cinereous bunting is a large (16–17 cm), slim bunting with a long, white-cornered tail. The term cinereous describes its colouration.  It is less streaked than many buntings and has a thick pale bill. It has a greyish back with only subdued dark markings, and a browner tint to the wings.

The adult male's head is dull yellow, with a brighter moustachial line and throat. In the nominate race of south-west Turkey, the rest of the underparts are grey, but the eastern form  E. c. semenowi has yellow underparts.

Females are brownish grey above with a whitish throat and yellow only in the moustachial stripe. Young birds have a plain pale belly and streaking on the breast.

Foraging and breeding 
Like other buntings, the cinereous bunting feeds principally on seeds. It takes insects especially when feeding its young. Its normal clutch is three eggs.

Song 
The call is a harsh tschrip, and the song is a hoarse zru- zru-zru-zru.

References

 Buntings and Sparrows by Byers, Olsson and Curson, 

cinereous bunting
Birds of Western Asia
Birds of East Africa
cinereous bunting
cinereous bunting